The women's road race H1-4 cycling event at the 2020 Summer Paralympics took place on 1 September 2021, at the Fuji Speedway in Shizuoka Prefecture. 16 riders competed in the event.

The event covers the following four classifications, all of which uses hand-operated bicycles:
H1: tetraplegics with severe upper limb impairment to the C6 vertebra.
H2: tetraplegics with minor upper limb impairment from C7 thru T3.
H3: paraplegics with impairment from T4 thru T10.
H4: paraplegics with impairment from T11 down, and amputees unable to kneel.

Results
The event took place on 1 September 2021 at 12:20.

References

Women's road race H1-4